An emergency main ballast tank blow is a procedure used aboard a submarine that forces high-pressure air into its main ballast tanks. The high-pressure air forces ballast water from the tanks, quickly lightening the ship so it can rapidly rise to the surface.

That accident resulted in substantial redesign of submarine emergency blow systems by the United States Navy: "Part of this initiative was to end the practice of brazing smaller pipes, and to instead start welding and doing X-ray inspection of joints to verify their integrity. It also resulted in changes in designs of the system that blows out the ballast tanks, providing a capability to do so seven times faster than the system used in the USS Thresher."

References

External links 

Submarine tactics